Höytala, old name Oytala (also, Voıtala) is a village in the Zaqatala Rayon of Azerbaijan. The village forms part of the municipality of Maqov.

References

External links

Populated places in Zaqatala District